The 2011 Portuguese legislative election was held on 5 June, to elect all 230 members of the Assembly of the Republic. Pedro Passos Coelho led the centre-right Social Democratic Party to victory over the Socialist Party, led by incumbent Prime Minister José Sócrates. Despite a historically low turnout of less than 60% of registered voters, the right-wing won a clear mandate, winning nearly 130 MPs, more than 56% of the seats, and just over 50% of the vote. While the People's Party, continuing the trend they began in 2009, earned their best score since 1983, the Social Democrats exceeded the expected result in the opinion polls and won the same number of seats as they did in 2002, when the PSD was led by José Manuel Durão Barroso. Of the twenty districts of the country, Pedro Passos Coelho's party won seventeen, including Lisbon, Porto, Faro, Portalegre, Castelo Branco, Coimbra, Santarém and the Azores, that tend to favor the Socialist Party.

The defeat of the PS was severe, as they lost in eleven districts and fell below 30% of the votes cast, a first since the election of 1991. This heavy defeat led José Sócrates to resign as General Secretary of the party on election night. However, it was not the Socialists' worst result, which dated back to 1987 when they polled 30 points behind the Social Democrats. The Socialists were also beaten in José Sócrates district, Castelo Branco, that he dominated since 1995.

For the left-wing parties, the result was mixed. On one hand, the Left Bloc faced a huge setback, losing half of its MPs and regaining its 2005 numbers, where they obtained however, one more percentage point in a context of greater participation. As a whole, the Portuguese left-wing parties trails by ten points in support to the right-wing parties, the biggest lead since the absolute majority of the Social Democrat Aníbal Cavaco Silva in the 1990s.

Voter turnout was one of the lowest in Portuguese election history, with just 58% of the electorate casting their ballot on election day.

Background 
The previous parliamentary elections were held in September 2009, and, as such, technically no elections were due until September or October 2013. However, the 2009 elections resulted in a hung parliament, as the Socialist Party (PS) continued to be the most voted force but lost the majority it previously had in the chamber. A minority government supported by the PS and headed by José Sócrates was formed, relying on negotiations with the opposition parties (namely the major opposition party PSD) to approve the most important and/or controversial bills, such as the State Budgets for 2010 and 2011.

Fall of the government
In March 2011, when the government had tried to introduce a Stability and Growth Pact without consultation with the president and the parliament, the opposition parties called for a resolution vote. The vote came over proposed spending cuts and tax hikes that had been demanded by the EU to offer a bailout over Portugal's debt levels amidst the European sovereign debt crisis. PM Jose Socrates had previously said that if the measure failed he would not be able to govern anymore. All five opposition parties combined to vote down the measure. With all other parties voting against the government, the Socialist Party was unable to avoid defeat as it only had 97 MPs in the 230-seat parliament. Following the vote in parliament on the evening of 23 March, Socrates stepped down, reiterating that he could no longer govern the country: "Today every opposition party rejected the measures proposed by the government to prevent that Portugal resort to external aid. The opposition removed from the government the conditions to govern. As a result, I have tendered my resignation to the president." The main opposition party, the Social Democratic Party (PSD), tipped the scales against the government by voting against the package, despite having abstained when voting previous austerity measures, thus allowing them to pass.

Following the vote, European markets read the move as making a possible 50–70 billion euro bailout "inevitable" the day before a European Union summit concerning the debt crisis. German Chancellor Angela Merkel praised Socrates for his "far-reaching" austerity bill in parliament. Portuguese two-year bond yields also increased to the most since 1999 on speculation of possible further credit downgrades.

President Aníbal Cavaco Silva then met with the various political parties to either resolve the crisis, or dissolve the parliament and call an early election, which, according to the Portuguese Constitution, can be held no sooner than 55 days after the announcement. On 1 April, the president set 5 June as the date for an early election, deeming it the only way to create conditions for a new government.

Following the call for an election, Socrates finally did make a request to the EU for a bailout on 6 April as the country's sovereign bond yield hit a record high; Portugal became the third EU state after Greece and Ireland, respectively, to request an EU bailout. Socrates said that "I tried everything but we came to a moment that not taking this decision would bring risks we can't afford. The Social Democrats' Pedro Passos Coelho said that his party would support the aid request; the International Monetary Fund also added that it was ready to support assistance that Portugal requested. Socrates said in a nationwide television address that his caretaker government had formally requested a bailout as it was "inevitable" and that "I tried everything, but in conscience we have reached a moment when not taking this decision would imply risks that the country should not take." His Finance Minister Fernando Teixeira dos Santos also said that Portugal would need the European Union support to avoid defaulting on its debt. In response, the European Commissioner for Economic and Monetary Affairs Olli Rehn said the action was "a responsible move" and that the specific amount of aid money would soon be determined. European Union officials suggested that they hoped a deal would be finalised by the middle of May with an expected bailout of around 80 billion euros.

Leadership changes

PSD 2010 leadership election

The then PSD leader Manuela Ferreira Leite declined to run for another term, and a new election to elect a new party leader was called for 26 March 2010. Pedro Passos Coelho, second place holder in 2008, won the elections by a landslide. The results were the following:

|- style="background-color:#E9E9E9"
! align="center" colspan=2 style="width:  60px"|Candidate
! align="center" style="width:  50px"|Votes
! align="center" style="width:  50px"|%
|-
|bgcolor=orange|
| align=left | Pedro Passos Coelho
| align=right | 31,671
| align=right | 61.2
|-
|bgcolor=orange|
| align=left | Paulo Rangel
| align=right | 17,821
| align=right | 34.4
|-
|bgcolor=orange|
| align=left | José Pedro Aguiar Branco
| align=right | 1,769
| align=right | 3.4
|-
|bgcolor=orange|
| align=left | Castanheira Barros
| align=right | 138
| align=right | 0.3
|-
| colspan=2 align=left | Blank/Invalid ballots
| align=right | 349
| align=right | 0.7
|-
|- style="background-color:#E9E9E9"
| colspan=2 style="text-align:left;" |   Turnout
| align=right | 51,748
| align=right | 66.26
|-
| colspan="4" align=left|Source: Official Results
|}

Electoral system 

The Assembly of the Republic has 230 members elected to four-year terms. Governments do not require absolute majority support of the Assembly to hold office, as even if the number of opposers of government is larger than that of the supporters, the number of opposers still needs to be equal or greater than 116 (absolute majority) for both the Government's Programme to be rejected or for a motion of no confidence to be approved.

The number of seats assigned to each district depends on the district magnitude. The use of the d'Hondt method makes for a higher effective threshold than certain other allocation methods such as the Hare quota or Sainte-Laguë method, which are more generous to small parties.

For these elections, and compared with the 2009 elections, the MPs distributed by districts were the following:

Parties
The table below lists the parties represented in the Assembly of the Republic during the 11th legislature (2009–2011) and that also partook in the election:

Concurrent issues
Popular anger arose during the electoral process leading to mass protests in multiple cities around the country.

External influence

EU bailout
In what was read as external interference during the campaign the EU's Olli Rehn said Portugal must make even stronger budget cuts than the measures that failed in parliament leading to the fall of the government. EU Finance Ministers said that about 80 billion euros could be available by mid-May should the austerity measures it demanded pass. Rehn said that the measures would be "a starting point. It is indeed essential in Portugal to reach a cross-party agreement ensuring that such a programme can be adopted [by] May."

On 16 May, the EU endorsed a 78-billion euro joint package with the IMF.

Finnish influence
Facing an election of his own, Finnish Finance Minister Jyrki Katainen said that Portugal's deficit-reduction steps must be even stronger than what was proposed in parliament prior to the election call. "The package must be really strict because otherwise it doesn't make any sense. The package must be harder and more comprehensive than the one the parliament voted against." The surge in popularity of the True Finns prior to the election could threaten a bailout for Portugal. Finland's support for the bailout was important because it would need unanimous support to pass.

Following a dramatic showing, stronger than opinion polls predicted, by the True Finns, and amid government formation talks, a bailout for Portugal was thrown into doubt. This was despite Katainen's pro-bailout National Coalition Party winning more seats than any other party (44 out of 200).

Economic outlook
On 5 April, Moody's cut Portugal's debt grade for the second in weeks citing its reason for doing so as "driven primarily by increased political, budgetary and economic uncertainty, which increase the risk that the government will be unable to achieve [its] ambitious deficit reduction targets." Its debt rating was decreased from A3 to Baa1, which was three grades above junk bond status.

IMF bailout
On 20 May, the IMF approved a €26 billion bailout for Portugal as part of joint support mechanisms with the EU. Of the total €6.1 billion would be made available immediately.

Campaign period

Party slogans

Candidates' debates

With parties represented in Parliament

With parties not represented in Parliament
A debate between parties not represented in Parliament was also broadcast on RTP1. The debate was marked by protests from the Portuguese Labour Party candidate, José Manuel Coelho, who sported banners and made numerous interruptions that disrupted the debate several times.

Opinion polling

Results
Anti-incumbency led to the defeat of the ruling party, even more than polls predicted. Pedro Passos Coelho of the Social Democratic Party is the Prime Minister-designate.

National summary

|-
| colspan="11" style="text-align:center;" | 
|-
! rowspan="2" colspan=2 style="background-color:#E9E9E9;text-align:left;" |Parties
! rowspan="2" style="background-color:#E9E9E9;text-align:right;" |Votes
! rowspan="2" style="background-color:#E9E9E9;text-align:right;" |%
! rowspan="2" style="background-color:#E9E9E9;text-align:right;" |±pp swing
! colspan="5" style="background-color:#E9E9E9;text-align:center;" |MPs
! rowspan="2" style="background-color:#E9E9E9;text-align:right;" |MPs %/votes %
|- style="background-color:#E9E9E9"
! style="background-color:#E9E9E9;text-align:center;" |2009
! style="background-color:#E9E9E9;text-align:center;" |2011
! style="background-color:#E9E9E9;text-align:right;" |±
! style="background-color:#E9E9E9;text-align:right;" |%
! style="background-color:#E9E9E9;text-align:right;" |±
|-
| 
|2,159,181||38.66||9.6||81||108||27||46.96||11.7||1.21
|-
| 
|1,566,347||28.05||8.5||97||74||23||32.17||10.0||1.15
|-
| 
|653,888||11.71||1.3||21||24||3||10.43||1.3||0.89
|-
| 
|441,147||7.90||0.0||15||16||1||6.96||0.4||0.88
|-
| 
|288,923||5.17||4.6||16||8||8||3.48||3.5||0.67
|-
| 
|62,610||1.12||0.2||0||0||0||0.00||0.0||0.0
|-
| 
|57,995||1.04||||||0||||0.00||||0.0
|-
| 
|22,705||0.41||0.3||0||0||0||0.00||0.0||0.0
|-
| 
|21,942||0.39||0.1||0||0||0||0.00||0.0||0.0
|-
| 
|17,548||0.31||0.1||0||0||0||0.00||0.0||0.0
|-
|style="width: 10px" bgcolor=#CC0033 align="center" | 
|align=left|Labour
|16,895||0.30||0.2||0||0||0||0.00||0.0||0.0
|-
| 
|14,687||0.26||0.0||0||0||0||0.00||0.0||0.0
|-
| 
|11,806||0.21||0.2||0||0||0||0.00||0.0||0.0
|-
| style="width:10px;background-color:#000080;text-align:center;" | 
| style="text-align:left;" |Portugal Pro-Life
|8,209||0.15||0.0||0||0||0||0.00||0.0||0.0
|-
| 
|4,572||0.08||0.0||0||0||0||0.00||0.0||0.0
|-
| 
|4,569||0.08||||||0||||0.00||||0.0
|-
| 
|3,588||0.06||||||0||||0.00||||0.0
|-
|colspan=2 style="text-align:left;background-color:#E9E9E9"|Total valid
|width="65" style="text-align:right;background-color:#E9E9E9"|5,357,037
|width="40" style="text-align:right;background-color:#E9E9E9"|95.92
|width="40" style="text-align:right;background-color:#E9E9E9"|1.0
|width="40" style="text-align:right;background-color:#E9E9E9"|230
|width="40" style="text-align:right;background-color:#E9E9E9"|230
|width="40" style="text-align:right;background-color:#E9E9E9"|0
|width="40" style="text-align:right;background-color:#E9E9E9"|100.00
|width="40" style="text-align:right;background-color:#E9E9E9"|0.0
|width="40" style="text-align:right;background-color:#E9E9E9"|—
|-
|colspan=2|Blank ballots
|148,618||2.66||0.9||colspan=6 rowspan=4|
|-
|colspan=2|Invalid ballots
|79,399||1.42||0.1
|-
|colspan=2 style="text-align:left;background-color:#E9E9E9"|Total 
|width="65" style="text-align:right;background-color:#E9E9E9"|5,585,054
|width="40" style="text-align:right;background-color:#E9E9E9"|100.00
|width="40" style="text-align:right;background-color:#E9E9E9"|
|-
|colspan=2|Registered voters/turnout
||9,624,354||58.03||1.7
|-
| colspan=11 style="text-align:left;" | Source: Comissão Nacional de Eleições
|}

Distribution by constituency

|- class="unsortable"
!rowspan=2|Constituency!!%!!S!!%!!S!!%!!S!!%!!S!!%!!S
!rowspan=2|TotalS
|- class="unsortable" style="text-align:center;"
!colspan=2 | PSD
!colspan=2 | PS
!colspan=2 | CDS–PP
!colspan=2 | CDU
!colspan=2 | BE
|-
| style="text-align:left;" | Azores
| style="background:; color:white;"|47.2
| 3
| 25.7
| 2
| 12.1
| -
| 2.5
| -
| 4.4
| -
| 5
|-
| style="text-align:left;" | Aveiro
| style="background:; color:white;"|44.5
| 8
| 25.9
| 5
| 12.9
| 2
| 4.1
| -
| 5.0
| 1
| 16
|-
| style="text-align:left;" | Beja
| 23.7
| 1
| style="background:; color:white;"|29.8
| 1
| 7.3
| -
| 25.4
| 1
| 5.2
| -
| 3
|-
| style="text-align:left;" | Braga
| style="background:; color:white;"|40.1
| 9
| 32.9
| 7
| 10.4
| 2
| 4.9
| 1
| 4.2
| -
| 19
|-
| style="text-align:left;" | Bragança
| style="background:; color:white;"|52.1
| 2
| 26.1
| 1
| 11.1
| -
| 2.6
| -
| 2.3
| -
| 3
|-
| style="text-align:left;" | Castelo Branco
| style="background:; color:white;"|37.9
| 2
| 34.8
| 2
| 9.6
| -
| 4.9
| -
| 4.2
| -
| 4
|-
| style="text-align:left;" | Coimbra
| style="background:; color:white;"|40.1
| 5
| 29.2
| 3
| 9.9
| 1
| 6.2
| -
| 5.8
| -
| 9
|-
| style="text-align:left;" | EvoraÉvora
| 27.6
| 1
| style="background:; color:white;"|29.0
| 1
| 8.7
| -
| 22.0
| 1
| 4.9
| -
| 3
|-
| style="text-align:left;" | Faro
| style="background:; color:white;"|37.0
| 4
| 23.0
| 2
| 12.7
| 1
| 8.6
| 1
| 8.2
| 1
| 9
|-
| style="text-align:left;" | Guarda
| style="background:; color:white;"|46.3
| 3
| 28.3
| 1
| 11.2
| -
| 3.6
| -
| 3.4
| -
| 4
|-
| style="text-align:left;" | Leiria
| style="background:; color:white;"|47.0
| 6
| 20.7
| 3
| 12.8
| 1
| 5.0
| -
| 5.4
| -
| 10
|-
| style="text-align:left;" | Lisbon
| style="background:; color:white;"|34.1
| 18
| 27.5
| 14
| 13.8
| 7
| 9.6
| 5
| 5.7
| 3
| 47
|-
| style="text-align:left;" | Madeira
| style="background:; color:white;"|49.4
| 4
| 14.7
| 1
| 13.7
| 1
| 3.7
| -
| 4.0
| -
| 6
|-
| style="text-align:left;" | Portalegre
| style="background:; color:white;"|32.5
| 1
| 32.4
| 1
| 10.2
| -
| 12.8
| -
| 4.5
| -
| 2
|-
| style="text-align:left;" | Porto
| style="background:; color:white;"|39.2
| 17
| 32.0
| 14
| 10.0
| 4
| 6.2
| 2
| 5.1
| 2
| 39
|-
| style="text-align:left;" | Santarém
| style="background:; color:white;"|37.6
| 5
| 25.9
| 3
| 12.3
| 1
| 9.0
| 1
| 5.8
| -
| 10
|-
| style="text-align:left;" | Setúbal
| 25.2
| 5
| style="background:; color:white;"|26.9
| 5
| 12.1
| 2
| 19.6
| 4
| 7.1
| 1
| 17
|-
| style="text-align:left;" | Viana do Castelo
| style="background:; color:white;"|43.6
| 3
| 26.2
| 2
| 13.4
| 1
| 4.9
| -
| 4.4
| -
| 6
|-
| style="text-align:left;" | Vila Real
| style="background:; color:white;"|51.4
| 3
| 29.1
| 2
| 8.7
| -
| 3.1
| -
| 2.3
| -
| 5
|-
| style="text-align:left;" | Viseu
| style="background:; color:white;"|48.4
| 5
| 26.7
| 3
| 12.4
| 1
| 2.9
| -
| 2.9
| -
| 9
|-
| style="text-align:left;" | Europe
| 29.2
| 1
| style="background:; color:white;"|39.6
| 1
| 5.5
| -
| 4.4
| -
| 3.3
| -
| 2
|-
| style="text-align:left;" | Outside Europe
| style="background:; color:white;"|55.1
| 2
| 18.0
| -
| 4.1
| -
| 0.8
| -
| 1.1
| -
| 2
|-
|- class="unsortable" style="background:#E9E9E9"
| style="text-align:left;" | Total
| style="background:; color:white;"|38.7
| 108
| 28.1
| 74
| 11.7
| 24
| 7.9
| 16
| 5.2
| 8
| 230
|-
| colspan=12 style="text-align:left;" | Source: Comissão Nacional de Eleições
|}

Maps

Aftermath

Government formation 
The XIX Constitutional Government of Portugal was formed with the legislative majority of the PSD and CDS-PP. On 6 June, President Aníbal Cavaco Silva called on Pedro Passos Coelho to form a government with "majority support in parliament" and asked for urgency in its formation to "develop immediate measures to propose a governance solution which has a parliamentary majority of support available and consistent."

Given the election result and the impossibility of forming a majority government with parliamentary support from a single party, the Social Democratic Party (PSD) led by Pedro Passos Coelho established an agreement for a majority government, signed on 16 June 2011, with the People's Party, led by Paulo Portas, after a few days of negotiations.

The XIX Constitutional Government took office on 21 June 2011.

2013 political crisis 
On 3 July 2013, Secretary of State for Treasury Maria Luis Albuquerque replaced Vitor Gaspar as the Minister of Finance. As a result, CDS leader Paulo Portas quit citing that the move would offer "mere continuity" as part of the austerity measures for the deficit-cutting plans. In saying that he would not resign, Coelho added: "I will try to clarify and guarantee with the CDS party all the conditions for the stability of the government and to proceed with the strategy of overcoming the nation's crisis." He added that "you know that this government has a tight-knit majority in the house to support it" and that the text of the resolution indicated that it was "fundamental to change the troika memorandum by renegotiation to finds a way to pay that does not contradict the country's economic growth."

In the fifth vote of confidence the government faced, as called by Os Verdes, the government was scheduled to win a vote despite being opposed by the Communists, Left Bloc and Socialists (if it failed the government would not be able to have another vote). Despite attempts to form a national unity government, Socialist party whip Carlos Zorrinho said that the move was not with the government but that all parties were available for a possible new government. The motion by Os Verdes was initiated on 14 July 2013 during a state of the nation debate. Coelho said that the vote was "very welcome" and would serve as a vote of confidence.

See also
 Politics of Portugal
 List of political parties in Portugal
 Elections in Portugal

Notes

References

External links 
 Preliminary results of the 2011 election
 Official results site, Portuguese Justice Ministry
 RTP Notícias – Election 2011
 Jornal de Notícias – Legislativas 2011
 Público - Election 2011
 Portuguese Electoral Commission
 NSD: European Election Database - Portugal publishes regional level election data; allows for comparisons of election results, 1991–2011

2011 elections in Portugal
2011 parliamentary
June 2011 events in Europe